The New Society Movement (KBL), formerly named the New Society Movement of United Nationalists, Liberals, et cetera (KBLNNL), is a right-wing political party in the Philippines. It was first formed in 1978 as an umbrella coalition of parties supporting then-President Ferdinand E. Marcos for the Interim Batasang Pambansa (the unicameral parliament) and was his political vehicle during his 20-year regime. It was reorganized as a political party in 1986, and is the furthest to the right of the political spectrum among active parties after Marcos' ouster.

Since 1986, the KBL has contested in most of the national and local elections in the Philippines, but retained a single seat in the House of Representatives in Ilocos Norte, which was held by former First Lady Imelda Marcos until 2019.

Establishment and ideology 

 
The ideological roots of the "Bagong Lipunan" ("new society") concept can be traced to one Marcos' rationalizations for the declaration of Martial Law in September we 1972. In his rhetoric, Marcos contended that a system of "constitutional authoritarianism" was necessary in order to "reform society" and create a "new society" under his authority.
 
Six years after the declaration of Martial Law, Marcos adopted this rhetoric and used the phrase as the name of the umbrella coalition of administration parties running in the 1978 Philippine parliamentary election. The coalition retained the name when it was reorganized as a political party in 1986.

Splinter factions after the People Power Revolution 

After the 1986 People Power Revolution ended Ferdinand Marcos' 21 years in power, he, his family and key followers fled to Hawaii. Marcos' party machinery quickly began to break into numerous factions, the most successful of which were Blas Ople's Partido Nacionalista ng Pilipinas, a reorganized Nacionalista Party led by Rafael Palmares and Renato Cayetano after the death of Senator Jose Roy, and a reorganized Kilusang Bagong Lipunan led by Nicanor Yñiguez.

By the time of the 1987 Philippine constitutional plebiscite, the reconstituted KBL under Yñiguez as the party furthest to the right among the rightwing political parties of the mid-1980s - remaining loyal to Marcos' authoritarian ideology in contrast to the Partido Nacionalista ng Pilipinas, which took a conservative centrist stance, and the Palmares wing of the Nacionalista party and the Kalaw wing of the Liberal Party took center-right stances.

2009 Party division

On November 20, 2009, the KBL forged an alliance with the Nacionalista Party (NP) between Bongbong Marcos and NP Chairman Senator Manny Villar at the Laurel House in Mandaluyong. Bongbong was later on removed as a member by the KBL National Executive Committee on November 29. As such, the NP broke its alliance with the KBL due to internal conflicts within the party, though Marcos remained part of the NP Senatorial line-up.

Candidates for the 2010 Philippine general election 
Vetellano Acosta – Presidential Candidate (lost)
Jay Sonza – Vice Presidential Candidate (lost)
Senatorial slate:
Alma Lood (lost)
Hector Villanueva (lost)
Shariff Ibrahim Albani (lost)

Notable members

Past
Rodolfo B. Albano, Jr. — (1987-1995; moved to Lakas-CMD in 1995) former Representative of 1st District of Isabela
Alejandro Almendras - former Member of Interim Batasang Pambansa from Southern Mindanao and Regular Batasang Pambansa from Davao del Sur's at-large district
Helena Benitez- former Member of Interim Batasang Pambansa from Region IV-A and Regular Batasang Pambansa from Cavite
Conrado M. Estrella III - (1987-1992; moved to Nationalist People's Coalition in 1992) former Representative of 6th District of Pangasinan
Salvador Laurel- Mambabatas Pambansa (Assemblyman) of Interim Batasang Pambansa from Region IV-A, before he left and formed UNIDO in 1980
Jaime C. Laya- 5th Governor of the Bangko Sentral ng Pilipinas, 1st Action Officer of Intramuros Administration, former Minister of Education, Culture, and Sports, Mambabatas Pambansa of Interim Batasang Pambansa from Minister of Budget and Management, Minister of Budget and Management
Bongbong Marcos — (moved to Nacionalista Party in 2009, then to Partido Federal ng Pilipinas in 2021) former Vice Governor and Governor of Ilocos Norte, Representative of 2nd District of Ilocos Norte, and Senator
Imee Marcos — (moved to Nacionalista Party) Senator, former Governor of Ilocos Norte, Representative of 2nd District of Ilocos Norte
Estelito Mendoza — former Solicitor General of the Philippines, Governor of Pampanga, Mambabatas Pambansa (Assemblyman) of Interim Batasang Pambansa from Region III, and Minister of Justice
Benjamin Romualdez- 10th Governor of Leyte, Ambassador of the Philippines to the United States, and Member of Interim Batasang Pambansa from Region VIII and Regular Batasang Pambansa from Leyte
Carlos P. Romulo- former Minister of Foreign Affairs and Member of Interim Batasang Pambansa from Region IV-A
Chavit Singson- Governor of Ilocos Sur
Cesar Virata- 4th Prime Minister of the Philippines, 3rd Director-General of National Economic and Development Authority, former Minister of Finance, and Mambabatas Pambansa (Assemblyman) of Interim Batasang Pambansa from Region IV-A and Regular Batasang Pambansa from Cavite

Present
Remy Albano- Vice Governor of Apayao
Raymond Bagatsing – Manila vice mayoral candidate (2022), actor
Roberto "Amay Bisaya" Reyes Jambongana – Bohol gubernatorial candidate (2019), comedian
Jerry Dalipog- Governor of Ifugao
Larry Gadon – Senatorial candidate (2016, 2019 and 2022), lawyer; pushed for the impeachment of former Chief Justice Maria Lourdes Sereno
Efren Rafanan Sr.- Provincial Board Member of Ilocos Sur

Electoral performance

Presidential and vice presidential elections

Legislative elections

References

Anti-communist parties
Conservative parties in the Philippines
Far-right politics in Asia
Political parties established in 1978
Presidency of Ferdinand Marcos